The Bangkok Recorder was the first Thai-language newspaper, first published monthly, and later bi-weekly, in Bangkok, Siam between July 4, 1844, and October 1845 in Thai only, and between January 16, 1865, and February 16, 1867, both in Thai and English. It was written and published by Dr. Dan Beach Bradley, an American Christian missionary who spent 35 years in the country.

Bradley published both English- and Thai-language editions of The Bangkok Recorder. The Thai edition measured 6 x 9 inches, and the English edition 12 x 18 inches. The newspaper had a two-column layout.

One-time subscribers of The Bangkok Recorder included King Mongkut and various Thai nobles. The newspaper eventually closed due to unprofitability. Bradley wrote in the paper urging subscribers to pay their fees. Lack of payment may have been the result of disapproval of Bradley's subject matter. In addition to local and foreign news, Bradley wrote on general topics, including science and politics. His writings on Christianity and Buddhism may have been perceived as critical of the dominant religion.

See also 
Timeline of English-language newspapers published in Thailand
List of online newspaper archives - Thailand

References

External links 
 
 
 

Defunct newspapers published in Thailand
Publications established in 1844
Publications disestablished in 1867
Mass media in Bangkok
Monthly newspapers
Biweekly newspapers
Thai-language newspapers
English-language newspapers published in Thailand